Metaeuchromius flavofascialis is a moth in the family Crambidae. It was described by Kyu-Tek Park in 1990. It is found in South Korea.

References

Crambinae
Moths described in 1990